The 70th Indianapolis 500 was held at the Indianapolis Motor Speedway in Speedway, Indiana on Saturday, May 31, 1986. After being rained out on May 25–26, the race was rescheduled for the following weekend.

Nearly the entire race unfolded as a three-way battle between polesitter Rick Mears, Bobby Rahal, and Kevin Cogan. Cogan, who was a key fixture in the controversial crash on the opening lap of the 1982 race, took the lead in dramatic fashion with 13 laps to go. Cogan, driving for Patrick Racing, appeared to be on his way to victory, and career redemption. But on lap 194, his lead evaporated when a spin by Arie Luyendyk brought out the caution flag. After a quick cleanup, the green flag came back out with two laps to go. Second place Bobby Rahal got the jump on the restart and grabbed the lead. Rahal pulled away and won the race, with car owner Jim Trueman, stricken with cancer, cheering him on in the pit area. Trueman died eleven days after the victory. At the time, it was the closest three-car finish in Indy history.

The race was sanctioned by USAC, and was included as part of the 1986 CART PPG Indy Car World Series. For the first time, ABC Sports televised the race live "flag-to-flag" on network television in the United States. The race celebrated the 75th anniversary of the first 500, but there was very little fanfare of the milestone outside of the cover art of the official program.

Offseason news

Garage area
The highlight of offseason improvements at the Indianapolis Motor Speedway was the construction of a new, state of the art garage area. Just days after the 1985 race, the old Gasoline Alley garage area, most of which had stood since the 1940s, was dismantled and demolished. Official groundbreaking for the new facility occurred on August 26, 1985. The new concrete garages increased to 96 units (up from 88), and each stall provided approximately 30% more working room than their predecessors. The green and white wooden barn doors were replaced with overhead steel garage doors, and the layout was changed from east–west to north–south. The access lanes were widened substantially, improving ingress and egress, improving drainage, and various vendor and support units were also part of the new complex. Lastly, a refueling complex was constructed in the southeast corner, including two underground tanks, one each for methanol and gasoline fuels. Most of the work was completed in April, however, some of the finishing touches were still being completed during the first week of on-track activity.

Though the new garages were universally praised for their increased space and function, they were criticized for lack of aesthetics, and for breaking tradition. The plain precast concrete walls resembled the cookie-cutter stadiums of the era that were largely criticized in baseball and football. The design was a sharp and striking contrast to the previous garage complex, which led some to call them overtly plain or "antiseptic." Changing the layout to north–south based was also a thinly-veiled attempt by the management to further scale back the oft-rowdy "Snakepit" area formerly located inside the turn one infield. The interiors were spacious and without walls (except those adjacent to the middle corridors), allowing teams the flexibility to erect partitions as they saw fit, as well as layout their work area however they desired. Lastly, the new complex greatly improved safety. The old wooden buildings were criticized as potential "fire traps," and management did not want a repeat of the devastating 1941 fire. The concrete construction was more fire-resistant, water spigots were provided in every stall, and the wider lanes provided easier fire escape.

Victory lane

A new victory lane area was constructed for the 1986 race. From 1971 to 1985, the winner drove up the checkerboard ramps into the "horseshoe" area below the Master Control Tower. A hydraulic platform was now used, which was located in the actual pit area, in line with the pit stalls. The car would drive onto the platform, and it would raise into the air, and then slowly spin 360° for the fans to see the winner.

This victory lane was popular, but could only a hold a small number of people when raised. It would be used through 1993.

Television
On August 19, 1985, after years of being shown tape delayed, ABC Sports signed an initial three-year deal to cover the Indianapolis 500 live flag-to-flag starting in 1986. Longtime anchor Jim McKay was moved to the host position, and play-by-play would be handled by Jim Lampley and Sam Posey.

The Daytona 500 had been shown live flag-to-flag on CBS since 1979, and ABC officials had wanted to do the same for Indianapolis for several years. ABC's landmark telecast was scheduled to feature 32 cameras, three RaceCams, and an hour-long live pre-race.

Team and driver changes
Defending Indy 500 winner Danny Sullivan returned to Penske Racing, however, the rest of the team saw a shake-up from the previous year. Rick Mears returned to full-time driving. After his serious crash at Sanair in 1984, Mears only drove a partial schedule (ovals only) in 1985. Al Unser, Sr., who drove full-time for Penske in 1985, and won the 1985 CART championship, dropped to part-time. Unser would race only the three 500 milers (Indy, Michigan, and Pocono), along with Phoenix and Tamiami. Unser was assigned the duty of being the first driver to roll out the brand new PC-15/Ilmor Chevy Indy V-8 265A.

Kevin Cogan moved over from the Kraco Team to Patrick Racing. Cogan joined Emerson Fittipaldi to make the team a two-car effort. Fittipaldi's new livery for 1986 featured a new sponsor to the sport, Marlboro, which would become a big part of the sport for over two decades.

Bobby Rahal won three of the last six races of 1985, and finished third in the points. Despite a heavy crash at Michigan in August, and a testing crash in the fall at Indy, Rahal was hot off the finish of the 1985 season, returning with Truesports, and a favorite entering the season.

Borg-Warner Trophy
For the month of May 1986, the Borg-Warner Trophy celebrated its 50th anniversary sporting a new look, featuring a brand new three-row base. The likeness of the 1986 race winner was going to fill the body of the trophy, and the new base was constructed in order to accommodate winners through 2003. On the base, the first square was filled with a gold likeness of the late Speedway president Tony Hulman. The base increased the height of the trophy to 55 inches, and the weight to about 95 pounds.

Race schedule

Practice and qualifying

Practice – week 1
Practice started on Opening Day, Saturday, May 3. Chip Ganassi earned the honor of first car on the track. On the second day of practice, the Andrettis continued their dominance, again posting the top two speeds.

On Tuesday, May 6, three single cars crashes marked the first incidents of the month. Danny Ongais, Herm Johnson, and Johnny Parsons all suffered single-car crashes in turn one, with Johnson's the most serious. Around 3:30 p.m., a piece of bodywork flew off Johnson's car in turn 1, which caused him to break into a hard spin. His car hit nearly head on into the retaining wall, and he suffered serious fractures to his feet and back.

The only incident of the day was a suspension failure and spin by Johnny Rutherford, but no wall contact resulted.

Pole Day time trials
Later in the session, Michael Andretti and Bobby Rahal both broke the  barrier. No incidents were reported.

Mears' one- and four- lap track records would stand for two years.

With about 10 minutes to go, A. J. Foyt lined up to make an attempt, but his car failed technical inspection, and he was sidelined for the day. After qualifying was over, the cars of Raul Boesel and Dick Simon, both of the same team, were disqualified for faulty pop-off valve fitting.

Second day time trials
After missing out on a qualifying attempt on pole day, A. J. Foyt took to the track on Sunday, May 11 to qualify for his 29th career Indy 500. He posted the 5th fastest speed in the field, but since he was a second day qualifier, he lined up deep in the field.

Raul Boesel re-qualified his machine, after being disqualified a day earlier. At the close of the day, the field was filled to 28 cars.

Practice – week 2
Rain delayed the opening of practice on Monday, May 12, and only 21 cars took laps Tuesday (May 13). Both days saw light activity, and the biggest news came off-the-track. Two-time winner Gordon Johncock planned to end a one-year retirement, and purchase a back-up car from Penske. However his funding fell through at the last minute, and he was forced to sit out the race.

On Tuesday, May 14, Mario Andretti was practicing his qualified car. A suspension piece failed, and he crashed hard into the turn 3 wall. Newman/Haas Racing would spend the next several days trying to make repairs, but the car's tub was rendered a total loss. Later in the week, Andretti started practicing his back-up car, which the team announced he would be driving on race day.

The remainder of the week saw sparse track activity. Most cars on the track belonged to yet-unqualified drivers. Thursday, May 15 was almost a complete wash out due to a thunderstorm.

Day 3 time trials
Despite threatening weather for the next two days, the third day of qualifying saw only four additional cars added to the field.

The day ended with 1 position left vacant in the field.

Bump Day time trials
As many as 12 cars started the day with hopes to make the field on the final day of time trials. Rain kept the track closed until 3 p.m., with qualifying finally getting underway at 4 p.m. By late afternoon, however, several cars were pulled out of line and chose not to make an attempt.

George Snider went out first in an A. J. Foyt back-up car, and filled the field to 33 cars. That placed Dick Simon on the bubble as the slowest car in the field. After a wave-off by Steve Chassey, Gary Bettenhausen took to the track, found some much sought after speed, and bumped his way into the field with ease.

With Geoff Brabham on the bubble, and with rain approaching, Rick Miaskiewicz was the next car out. His first two laps were not nearly fast enough, and his team waved him off. That gave Derek Daly just enough time to get out on the track. His first two laps were fast enough to bump Brabham, but as he was completing his second lap, the skies poured rain, and the run was negated.

Geoff Brabham held on as the slowest car in the field, while Dick Simon, the only car bumped, stood as the first alternate. Qualifying for the day lasted less than 45 minutes.

Carburetion Day
On Thursday, May 23, the final scheduled practice session was held. All 33 qualified cars except Phil Krueger took practice laps. At 11:43 a.m., a major crash occurred. A brake rotor on Dennis Firestone's car exploded, blowing his left rear tire. He spun wildly out of turn four, collecting the car of Roberto Moreno. Both cars spun into the inside wall, and Firestone slammed into the pit-entrance barrier, splitting the car in half. Moreno continued to spin through the pits, running into the back of George Snider's car, and crashing into the parked car of Josele Garza.

None of the drivers were seriously injured, however, Firestone's car was damaged beyond repair. The following day, Firestone's car was withdrawn from the field. George Snider and Roberto Moreno announced they would be driving back-up cars in the race. Both cars moved to the back of the grid. After Firestone withdrew, the first alternate Dick Simon was awarded the 33rd starting position.

Later in the day, Penske Racing and driver Danny Sullivan won the annual Miller Indy Pit Stop Contest. Sullivan's team defeated the Truesports team (Bobby Rahal) in the final round to win the event for the second year in a row.

Starting grid

† - Mario Andretti qualified 5th on pole day. A few days later, he crashed his already-qualified car, and it was damaged beyond repair. The car was replaced with a back-up car, and was moved the rear of the field.
†† - George Snider and Roberto Moreno were both involved in the multi-car crash on Carburetion Day. Both primary cars were damaged beyond repair. Their cars were replaced with back-up cars, and moved to the rear of the field, Moreno originally qualified in 16th place.
‡ - After Dennis Firestone withdrew his wrecked car, Dick Simon was added to field in the 33rd position as the first alternate

Qualified cars withdrawn
Dennis Firestone; wrecked on Carburetion Day and withdrawn.

Alternates
First alternate: Dick Simon (#23) – Bumped – Named to starting field on 5/23
Second alternate: none

Failed to qualify
Derek Daly (#28) – Incomplete qualifying run due to rain
Rick Miaskiewicz  (#19) – Waved off
Steve Chassey (#56/#65) – Waved off
Steve Bren  (#25)
Spike Gehlhausen (#10)
Rupert Keegan  (#56/#65) – Did not make an attempt
Jan Lammers   (#98) – Did not make an attempt
Herm Johnson (#28) – Wrecked in practice, injured
Mike Nish  (#44/#45)
John Paul Jr. (#31) Paul withdrew after a few days of practice after being sentenced to prison for his involvement in drug trafficking with his father, John Paul, Sr.

Rain delay

Sunday, May 25

The race was scheduled to be held Sunday, May 25. Despite a forecast of only a 15% chance of precipitation, race morning saw overcast skies and steady rain. Track drying efforts began around 10:45 a.m. EST. The track was close to dry, and spectators began filing into their seats. The cars were then wheeled to the pits, in preparations for a start. At 1:15 p.m., however, the rain resumed, and threatened to wash out the entire day. The rain stopped, and track drying efforts started a second time. The rain returned once more, and at 3:35 p.m., officials rescheduled the race for Monday. During the delay, ABC-TV diverted its programming for several minutes in favor of live coverage of Hands Across America.

Grim memories of the tragic 1973 race were still in many people's minds, and all involved were determined to make certain the race would not be hastily put on in a rushed, last-minute, fashion. In addition, officials were uncommitted on how late they would permit a start, and if they would aim for a 101-lap race (the minimum distance for the event to be official), or insist on adequate time for a full 200-lap race before sunset. The weather forecast for Monday (80% chance of rain) was yet another concern.

Monday, May 26
On Monday, May 26, there was no chance to hold the race, as it rained all day. The infield turned into a sea of mud, and most of the spectators had since departed, going home to their jobs. Authorities estimated Monday's attendance at a paltry 5,800 spectators. Those who did arrive merely milled around, as most of the infield was impassable, concession stands were out of food, and souvenir tents were empty and abandoned. Some visited the  Speedway museum.

At 3:20 p.m., officials announced that the race was going to be postponed, but did not yet announce the date or time to which it would be rescheduled. Unsubstantiated rumors even circulated about canceling the race outright. ABC television was scheduled to cover the race live for the first time, but did not commit to live coverage on Tuesday. Track officials were faced with the possibility of running the race on Tuesday in front of empty grandstands, and without live TV coverage. Weather forecasts for Tuesday and Wednesday were not promising, a substantial amount of the track staff was unavailable, and the sloppy conditions made parts of the facility impassable. Around 6 p.m. on Monday evening, a deal had been struck to reschedule the race for Saturday, May 31.

Mid-week
During the week, teams spent time resting and relaxing, while others prepared for the next race at Milwaukee. Track crews worked diligently to clean up the infield, and make it passable for Saturday. As a result of the postponement, a special thirty-minute practice session was arranged on Friday, May 30. Participants were held to a  speed limit, and it served mostly as a leak check exercise. Some drivers, including polesitter Rick Mears, as well as Bobby Rahal, did not even participate. The five-day delay wound up being a popular choice by nearly all of the participants. It allowed them to rest and unwind, and regroup for race day without the uncertainty that was looming over them of when the race would start.

For the weekend, the Rex Mays 200 at Milwaukee, originally scheduled for Sunday June 1, was pushed back one week to accommodate the Indy rain delay. The 1986 race marked the first time since 1973 that the race was pushed to another day, and the first time since 1915 that 'not a single wheel had turned' all weekend because of rain. It also marked the first time since 1967 the race was held May 31; until 1971, when the race was always held on May 30, if that day was a Sunday, it was held the ensuing Monday, May 31. As of 2021, it is the most recent "500" to be held on May 31, and until 2020, was the longest postponement in Indy history.

Race summary

Start
Saturday, May 31 saw sunny skies and temperatures in the low 80s. Traditional pre-race ceremonies were retooled slightly, with some replacement performers. The Purdue band was absent, while Robert McFarland, scheduled to sing "Back Home Again in Indiana", had departed and was replaced by John S. Davies, the artist-in-residence at the Indianapolis Opera. A smaller balloon spectacle was also hastily arranged, after all of the original balloons had lost their helium by Monday afternoon. An army band from Fort Benjamin Harrison was brought in to accompany the performances, and to perform "Taps." Mary F. Hulman gave the starting command just minutes before 11 a.m., and the field pulled away for the parade and pace laps.

On the final pace lap, Tom Sneva veered off-course at the exit of turn 2. Further down the backstretch, a massive smoke bomb was set off by some unruly spectators. The yellow flag was displayed, and the start was waved off. The next time by, the field was red-flagged, and halted on the frontstretch. Sneva's crash was cleaned up, but it was determined that the field had burned an unnecessary four laps of fuel. A decision was made to replenish each of the 32 remaining cars' pitside fuel tanks with 3 gallons of methanol. The red flag wound up delaying the start by over a half-hour.

At 11:34 a.m., Tony George gave the command to restart the engines, and the field assembled for two pace laps. The field was straggling through the fourth turn to take the green, and Michael Andretti jumped into the lead from the outside of the front row. After a postponement of six days, and after another half hour delay due to the Sneva crash, the race was finally underway.

First half
After charging from the 30th starting position, Mario Andretti's day was short-lived. On the 15th lap, he brought out the yellow when he stalled in turn three with an ignition problem. Michael Andretti set the early pace, leading the first 42 laps. Mario later returned to the track, but his car lasted only four additional laps, and he finished 32nd.

The first half of the race saw record average speed, with only two yellows for 10 laps, and no major incidents. The second yellow on lap 52 came out for debris when Michael Andretti lost a mirror. Rick Mears came to the lead by lap 49, and held it until the next round of pit stops. On lap 83, Bobby Rahal took the lead for 19 laps, and led at the halfway point.

Second half
Johnny Parsons spun out of turn two on lap 102, and came to a stop along the inside wall. The car suffered minor damage, and Parsons was uninjured. After another long stretch of green, Rich Vogler crashed in turn three on lap 135.

On the 135th lap, Rahal (1st) and Cogan (2nd) pitted under caution. Rahal's crew nearly made a critical error, and did not change the left-front tire (it had not been changed yet in the race). Rahal had to pit once again the next time around to correct the oversight. Since the field was under caution, the consequences were not quite as serious, but he still fell from 1st to 4th.

On the restart, Rick Mears resumed as the leader. Short-pitting due to poor handling, 4th place Michael Andretti was the first of the leaders to pit again (on lap 163). Mears led all the way until his final scheduled pit stop on lap 165. Moments later Roberto Moreno brought out the caution by stalling in turn four. After Rahal and Cogan cycled through their final planned stops on lap 166, Mears again found himself up front. Michael Andretti (at the tail-end of the lead lap in 4th place) actually led the field behind the pace car as the field went back to green with 31 laps to go. Observers noted that the three leaders would have to complete the final 34 laps on one tank of fuel. Without another caution, it was feared that they might need a splash-and-go stop for fuel in order to make it to the finish.

Finish

With 14 laps to go, Rick Mears led Bobby Rahal and Kevin Cogan. Fourth place Michael Andretti was still clinging on to the tail-end of the lead lap, just ahead of Mears. As the leaders approached traffic, Rahal looked to pass Mears for the lead. Down the backstretch, Rahal took the lead and headed towards turn 3. Cogan passed Mears on the outside of turn four and took second place. Down the frontstretch, Rahal was caught up behind the slower car of Randy Lanier. Cogan diced back and forth, and slipped by Rahal going into turn one.

With then 13 laps to go, Cogan suddenly pulled out to a sizable 3-second lead. Cogan's car was visibly loose in the turns, and on several occasions nearly clipped the outside wall in turn 2. Rahal was having trouble keeping up with the hard-charging Cogan, while Mears had slipped to third and appeared to be having some handling difficulties. With 7 laps to go, fourth place Michael Andretti ducked into the pit area for a splash of fuel. On lap 194, Arie Luyendyk who was running 11th, spun exiting turn four. His car whipped around and lightly tagged the inside wall near the entrance of the pits. The yellow flag came out, and the field was bunched up behind the pace car. Cogan's lead was erased, but there was some conjecture that the race could finish under yellow, with Cogan the certain winner. With the help of the yellow, the fuel concerns were now lessened.

Safety crews were able to clean up the incident quickly. Cogan led, with Rahal second, and Mears third, all together on the track. With 2 laps to go, the lights on the pace car were turned off, signifying that the field was ready to go back to green. Cogan, Rahal, and Mears picked up the pace in the north chute, and came out of turn four for a restart and two laps to go. Rahal got the jump on Cogan out of turn four, and took the lead mid-way down the frontstretch. Rahal led at the line, and dove in front of Cogan in turn one.

Down the backstretch, Rahal pulled to over a 1-second lead, and Mears set up to pass Cogan in turn three. Cogan held off the challenge, as Rahal took the white flag. Rahal's speed on the 199th lap was a noteworthy . Rahal pulled out to a 1.4 second advantage, and won his first Indianapolis 500. Cogan and Mears finished second and third, in what was the closest three-car finish to date. Rahal's final lap was an all-time record , the fastest race lap to-date in Indy 500 competition.

His average speed of 170.722 broke Rick Mears' 1984 record. Rahal later claimed his fuel light had come on during the final lap, and a post-race inspection showed that only two gallons of methanol fuel remained in his tank.

Race box score

Statistics

Post race

The race celebration was emotional for the Truesports team, in that owner Jim Trueman was stricken with cancer. Visibly frail and lacking strength, he managed to arrive in victory lane to celebrate with his driver Bobby Rahal: as the race ended, he reportedly told ABC reporter Jack Arute, "I can go now". Due to the rain delay, the traditional victory banquet was canceled. A makeshift victory luncheon was held in its place on Sunday June 1 at the Speedway Motel. The top three finishers were invited to the private reception. Later, Rahal's crew celebrated with a lunch at the nearby Red Lobster.

The city of Columbus held a victory celebration downtown on June 5. Over 300 Red Roof Inn employees took part in a parade down Broad Street. Trueman was too sick to attend. On June 11, Trueman succumbed to his illness, at the age of 51.

Rahal and the Truesports team rode the wave of success to five additional wins during the CART season, and clinched the 1986 CART championship. The team made it back-to-back titles by winning the 1987 CART championship as well.

Kevin Cogan suffered through his second major disappointment at Indy, following the misfortunes of 1982. Despite winning the season opener at Phoenix, he faded as a contender during the season. He also was asked several times, during the month of May, about his accident in 1982 with Andretti and Foyt, leading Cogan to reportedly exit a press conference early. Race winner Rahal, on Cogan's redemption story, remarked afterwards, "1982 was a bum rap. The drivers treated him unfairly. He suffered through some rough times . . . I can't imagine what it must have been like to go to a race and have people boo you."(28)

Broadcasting

Radio
The race was carried live on the IMS Radio Network. Paul Page served as the chief announcer for the tenth year. It was Page's thirteenth year overall as part of the network crew. Lou Palmer reported from victory lane. Bobby Unser, Page's frequent booth partner on NBC Sports, joined the broadcast for the first and only time as "driver expert."

Ron Carrell and Jerry Baker swapped places, with Carrell moving to the north pits (where he remained until 1990) and Baker moving to the high-profile Turn 1 location. Baker has remained in that location until 2017 (except 2010 and 2013 when it was vacant) as he would depart the crew and join the public address crew for 2018 when it was decided that Turn 1 would not be used in 2018 but due to a new broadcast booth debuting in 2019 named after Sid Collins, Turn 1's broadcasting location would be reinstated.. Gary Gerould (one of Page's NBC colleagues), made his first appearance as a pit reporter, sharing duties in the south pits with Lou Palmer.

Luke Walton reprised his traditional duty of introducing the starting command during the pre-race, however, he did not have an active role during the race.

Television
The race was carried in the United States on ABC Sports on live, flag-to-flag coverage for the first time. Jim McKay moved to the host position, while Jim Lampley served as announcer.

The initial live broadcast set for Sunday, May 25 was rained out. The telecast was filled with interviews, talk, and highlights of previous races. The broadcast returned on Saturday, May 31 for the live coverage of the race.

Three pit reporters served on the crew, joined by Donna de Varona, who was slated to serve as a roving reporter, conducting interviews and other features. However, she appeared only on the original Sunday telecast, and did not return on Saturday. Dr. Joe Randolph was also announced as part of the team, slated to report from the medical center, but he never appears on-air.

Three RaceCams were used (none were utilized in 1985), with defending champion Danny Sullivan the highest-profile driver to feature one. For the first time, the broadcast carried all of the pre-race ceremonies live, although they omitted coverage of the invocation.

The broadcast has re-aired numerous times on ESPN Classic since the mid-2000s.

Quotes 
Paul Page described the finish of IMS Radio Network:

Kevin Cogan responding to Sam Posey for an in-race radio interview with only 3 laps to go:

Sam Posey on ABC-TV after being snubbed by Kevin Cogan:

Gallery

Notes

References

28. RUNNER-UP ROLE REMOVES CLOUD OVER COGAN FROM 1982 ACCIDENT https://www.orlandosentinel.com/news/os-xpm-1986-06-01-0220430247-story.html

Works cited
1986 Indianapolis 500 Day-By-Day Trackside Report For the Media
Indianapolis 500 History: Race & All-Time Stats - Official Site
1986 Indianapolis 500 Radio Broadcast, Indianapolis Motor Speedway Radio Network

Indianapolis 500 races
Indianapolis 500
Indianapolis 500
Indianapolis 500